Jorge Robledo (1926–1989) was a Chilean footballer.

Jorge Robledo may also refer to: 

 Jorge Enrique Robledo (born 1950), Colombian architect and politician
 Jorge Robledo (conquistador) (1500–1546), Spanish conquistador